The 1998 London Marathon was the 18th running of the annual marathon race in London, United Kingdom, which took place on Sunday, 26 April. The elite men's race was won by Spain's Abel Antón in a time of 2:07:57 hours and the women's race was won by Ireland's Catherina McKiernan in 2:26:26.

In the wheelchair races, Switzerland's Heinz Frei (1:35:18) and Britain's Tanni Grey (2:02:01) won the men's and women's divisions, respectively. Frei's winning time was a course record by a margin of nearly four minutes.

Around 96,000 people applied to enter the race, of which 42,228 had their applications accepted and 30,663 started the race. A total of 29,972 runners finished the race.

Results

Men

Women

Wheelchair men

Wheelchair women

References

Results
Results. Association of Road Racing Statisticians. Retrieved 2020-04-19.

External links

Official website

1998
London Marathon
Marathon
London Marathon